INS Karmuk is a , currently in active service with the Indian Navy.

Service history

South China Sea and the North West Pacific 
The ships, as part of a battle group of 4 ships began a sustained operational deployment to the South China Sea and the North West Pacific Ocean. the other three ships were INS Rana, a Rajput class guided missile destroyer, INS Shivalik, a stealth frigate, and INS Shakti, a Deepak-class fleet tanker. This battle group was under the command of Rear Admiral P Ajit Kumar, Flag Officer Commanding, Eastern Naval Command. According to the Ministry of Defence, the two-month deployment, far from India's usual area of operations, along with naval exercises with a number of countries, aimed to demonstrate the Indian navy's operational reach.

During the deployment the battle group participated in passage exercises with the navies of the countries visited. The 'Passage Exercises' focussed on maritime security cooperation, which included humanitarian aid & disaster relief (HADR) operations and 'visit, board, search and seizure' (VBSS) drills for anti-piracy operations. These exercises aimed to increase naval inter-operability, enabling the two navies to function together smoothly during possible HADR operations. In addition, during the port visits, the Fleet Commander along with the commanding officers of the ships met high-ranking officials of the Navy, state administration, port management, coastal security organization, police, and other stakeholders of maritime security in the countries visited, to share professional experiences and exchange
best practices in areas of mutual interest.

JIMEX 2012 
The ship was deployed in the North West Pacific for JIMEX 2012 (Japan-India Maritime Exercise) with the four ship group, and took part in India's first bi-lateral maritime exercise with Japan. The Japanese Maritime Self Defence Force (JMSDF) was represented by two destroyers, one maritime patrol aircraft and a helicopter.

The four ships entered Tokyo on 5 June 12 after visiting Singapore, Vietnam, Philippines and Republic of Korea. They stayed in Tokyo for 3 days. This visit coincides with commemoration of 60 years of diplomatic relations between India and Japan. Vice Admiral Anil Chopra, Flag Officer Commanding-in-Chief Eastern Naval Command also visited Tokyo to witness the first JIMEX.

Southeast Asia 
After the deployment in the North pacific, the battle group was deployed in the South China Sea. As part of India's Look East policy, the ships visited the Shanghai port on 13 June 2012, for a five-day goodwill tour. INS Shakti served as the fuel and logistics tanker to the three destroyers. The ships left the port on 17 June 2012. Before leaving the port, the ships conducted routine passage exercise with the People's Liberation Army Navy.

After the visits to Singapore, Vietnam, Philippines, Japan, South Korea and China, the ships visited Port Klang, Malaysia. This was the last port call of the battle group, after which it returned to the Eastern fleet of the Indian Navy, after being on a two-month-long deployment which started in May 2012.

References

External links

Kora-class corvettes
Corvettes of the Indian Navy

Naval ships of India

2001 ships
Ships built in India